Champions is a 2018 Spanish comedy-drama film directed by Javier Fesser.

Plot
This movie is inspired by Aderes team in Burjassot (Valencia), a team created with people with intellectual disabilities that won twelve Spanish championships between 1999 and 2014.

Marco Montes is the assistant coach of the basketball team CB Estudiantes. He is an arrogant man with bad manners and is fired from his job after pushing the head coach during a game over a disagreement over team strategy. After driving drunk into the back of a police car, Marco is ordered to either spend two years in prison or ninety days of community service, in the form of coaching Los Amigos, a team of basketball players with disabilities. At first, Montes complains about coaching the disabled players calling them subnormales (below normal). However, as he continues to coach the team, he realizes that each of the players has a unique background and they are extremely persistent in working together and playing well.

Meanwhile, Marco and his wife Sonia are fighting with each other because Sonia wants a child and Marco is not ready yet. In particular, Iván, one of Marco's friends, meets Sonia at a bar and tells her that he is meeting with Marco over the weekend and that she can come to confront Marco then. Iván then proceeds to tell Marco that he is not going to go out with him in an attempt to get some alone time with Sonia because he finds her attractive. However, Marco still shows up and discusses with Sonia, they leave the bar still upset with each other. After Los Amigos's first away game, Marco realizes that it is incredibly difficult to travel with the team given their abrupt and often annoying interactions with the other people on public transportation. Marco tells Sonia about these difficulties, and she helps loan a camper van from her coworker at a sports gear shop. She then joins Marco and his team over several games and their relationship improves.

In the end, Los Amigos place second in the National Series, and Marco agrees to have a child with Sonia. As Marco leaves the Los Amigos team to go back to coaching professionally, he is thanked by all the team members for changing their lives.

Cast

Production 
The film is a Películas Pendelton, Rey de Babia AIE, Morena Films, and Telefónica Studios production.

Release 
Distributed by Universal Pictures International Spain, the film was theatrically released in Spain on 6 April 2018.

Reception

Box office
The film is the highest-grossing Spanish language film of 2018 in Spain, with a box-office taking of €19.1 million from 3.3 million admissions.

Accolades 
It was selected as the Spanish entry for the Best Foreign Language Film at the 91st Academy Awards, but it was not nominated. The film won three Goya Awards, including Best Film, Best New Actor (Jesús Vidal), and Best Original Song ("Este es el momento", by Coque Malla).
The film received five nominations for the 6th Platino Awards, including Best Ibero-American Film and Best Director.

|-
| rowspan = "23" align = "center" | 2019
| rowspan = "2" | 24th Forqué Awards || colspan = "2" | Best Film ||  || rowspan = "2" | 
|-
| Best Actor || Javier Gutiérrez || 
|-
| rowspan = "4" | 6th Feroz Awards || colspan = "2" | Best Comedy Film ||  || rowspan = "4" | 
|-
| Best Director || Javier Fesser || 
|-
| Best Actor in a Film || Javier Gutiérrez || 
|-
| Best Trailer || || 
|-
| rowspan = "11" | 33rd Goya Awards || colspan = "2" | Best Film ||  || rowspan = "11" | 
|-
| Best Director || Javier Fesser ||  
|-
| Best Original Screenplay || Javier Fesser, David Marqués || 
|-
| Best Actor || Javier Gutiérrez || 
|-
| Best Supporting Actor || Juan Margallo || 
|-
| Best New Actress || Gloria Ramos || 
|-
| Best New Actor || Jesús Vidal || 
|-
| Best Editing || Javier Fesser || 
|-
| Best Production Supervision || Luis Fernández Lago || 
|-
| Best Original Song || "Este es el momento" by Coque Malla || 
|-
| Best Sound || Arman Ciudad, Charly Schmukler, Alfonso Raposo || 
|-
| 28th Actors and Actresses Union Awards || Best Film Actor in a Secondary Role || Juan Margallo ||  || 
|-
| rowspan = "5" | 6th Platino Awards || colspan = "2" | Best Ibero-American Film ||  || rowspan = "5" | 
|-
| Best Director || Javier Fesser || 
|-
| Best Screenplay || David Marqués, Javier Fesser || 
|-
| Best Actor || Javier Gutiérrez || 
|-
| colspan = "2" | Cinema and Education in Values ||  
|}

Sequel and remake 
Fesser wrapped shooting of sequel film Campeonex by November 2022.

Champions is an American remake directed by Bobby Farrelly, executively co-produced by Fesser, and starring Woody Harrelson). It premiered on March 10, 2023. Aamir Khan announced a Indian cinema remake of this film, and started shooting in January 2023.

See also
 List of Spanish films of 2018
 List of submissions to the 91st Academy Awards for Best Foreign Language Film
 List of Spanish submissions for the Academy Award for Best Foreign Language Film

References

External links
 

2018 films
2010s sports comedy-drama films
Films set in Spain
Films shot in Madrid
Basketball films
Down syndrome in film
Spanish sports comedy-drama films
2010s Spanish-language films
Best Film Goya Award winners
Morena Films films
2010s Spanish films